Chew Peck Choo is a Malaysian politician from Democratic Action Party. She was the Member of Johor State Legislative Assembly for Yong Peng from 2013 to 2022.

Education 

She has studied in the Kluang High School and SMK Dato Menteri. She is a Bachelor of Mathematics and Bachelor of Science from University of Malaya.

Politics 
In the 2013 Malaysian general election, she won the Yong Peng seat on the ticket of DAP and was able to defend her seat in the 2018 Malaysian general election. She was the Treasurer for DAP Johor from 2004 to 2013. She was also the Women's Chief of DAP Johor from 2013 to 2016, Deputy Women's Chief from 2016 to 2018 and Assistant of Women's Chief from 2018 to 2022.

Election results

Health 
She had suffered from stroke in 2018 but has recovered completely in 2020.

Retirement 
On 22 January 2022, she announced her retirement from politics and will not participate in the 2022 Johor state election.

References 

Democratic Action Party (Malaysia) politicians
Malaysian people of Chinese descent
Living people
1968 births